The Canon PowerShot D is a series of digital cameras released by Canon in 2009. 

The D series cameras are designed for underwater and heavy-duty use. 

Releases of D series:
 D30 (announced Feb 12, 2014) is waterproof up to 25 m (82 ft) it was the world's deepest camera without housing, temperature −10 °C to 40°C, shock-resistant up to 2 meters, dust proof, effective pixel 12.1-megapixel CMOS, ISO up to 3200, optical zoom 5×, zoom (eq. 35mm) 28–140mm, digital zoom 4*, 1024p Full HD video with dedicated button, 640 * 480 or 320 * 240 (120, 240 fps), miniature effect: 1920 * 1080 or 1280 * 720 (1.5, 3, 6 fps), Sunlight LCD for better view in bright condition, built-in flash, size: 109 × 68 × 28 mm, weight 218 grams, built-in GPS tracker.
 D20 (announced Feb 7, 2012) is waterproof up to 10 m (33 ft), temperature −10 °C, shock-resistant, effective pixel 12.1-megapixel CMOS, ISO up to 3600, zoom mechanical 5×, zoom (35mm) 28–140mm, size: 112 × 71 × 28 mm, weight 228 grams, built-in GPS.
 D10 (announced Feb 18, 2009) is waterproof to 10 m (33 ft), and freeze- and shock-resistant. Because the waterproof case limits lens size, the D10 has a 3× optical zoom lens; resolution is 12.1 MP.

See also
 Canon PowerShot

References

External links
Canon Product Website
Best Vlogging Cameras With Flip Screen

D
Cameras introduced in 2009